Ponte Principe Amedeo Savoia Aosta, also known as Ponte Principe or Ponte PASA after its acronym, is a bridge that links Lungotevere dei Sangallo to Piazza Della Rovere in Rome (Italy), in the Rioni Ponte, Trastevere and Borgo.

Description 
The bridge has 3 brick arcades covered with white marble. Between the arcades there are two single-lancet windows with rounded arches. The arcades divide the Tiber into 3 branches by 2 pillars that vaguely look like ships.

It links the Basilica of San Giovanni dei Fiorentini and the area of Corso Vittorio Emanuele II to the tunnel that brings to Via Aurelia through Via di Gregorio VII.

History 
The bridge is dedicated to Prince Amedeo of Savoy-Aosta, Viceroy of Ethiopia.

The building of the bridge was committed to the Company Stoelker, while the design was realised by the Municipality of Rome.

The bridge was completed in 1942, after 34 months and several interruptions.
During the construction, a provisional iron bridge was released, in order to allow the circulation of traffic.

External links 
Info

Bridges in Rome R. XIII Trastevere
Bridges in Rome R. XIV Borgo
Bridges in Rome R. V Ponte
Bridges completed in 1942
1942 establishments in Italy
Road bridges in Italy